Lantier can refer to:

 Lantier, Quebec, a municipality in Canada
 Étienne-François de Lantier (1734–1826)
 Jacques Philippe Lantier (1814–1882), a Canadian businessman, author and politician from Quebec
 Raymond Lantier (1886–1980), French archaeologist
 Pierre Lantier (1910–1998), a French composer and pianist

See also
 Lanthier (disambiguation)